Jaroslav Pollert (born 16 August 1943) is a former Czechoslovak slalom canoeist who competed from the late 1950s to the mid-1970s. He won four medals at the ICF Canoe Slalom World Championships with three golds (C-2: 1973, C-1 team: 1961, C-2 team: 1965) and a silver (C-2 team: 1973).

References

Czechoslovak male canoeists
Living people
1943 births
Medalists at the ICF Canoe Slalom World Championships
Czech male canoeists